Pickmore Jackson (November 7, 1822February 9, 1892) was an American shoemaker and politician.

Personal life
Born in Saugus, Massachusetts on November 7, 1822 to William and Mary (Stocker) [Stanford] Jackson, Pickmore Jackson married Lura Nourse on September 14, 1848.  They had five daughters, all born in Saugus: Louise Abby Jackson (May 28, 1850January 9, 1870), Mary Ella Jackson (born April 18, 1852), Susan Stanford Jackson (June 12, 1855September 7, 1870), Gertrude Jackson (November 18, 1858May 27, 1880), and Addie Augusta Jackson (born December 2, 1862).  Lura died in Saugus on January 29, 1892, and Pickmore died there eleven days later on February 9, 1892.

Career
In 1842, Jackson joined the shoemaking renaissance in Saugus, following the lead of the Raddin and Newhall families.  Soon thereafter, he was elected by a majority of Saugus voters as their 1844 representative in the Massachusetts House of Representatives, replacing Benjamin F. Newhall.  In 1845, no representative was sent as nobody received a majority of votes, so Jackson wasn't succeeded until Sewall Boardman served from 1846–47.  By 1862, Jackson had also served on the Saugus school committee.

References

1822 births
1892 deaths
19th-century American politicians
members of the Massachusetts House of Representatives
people from Saugus, Massachusetts
school board members in Massachusetts
shoemakers